PNC Plaza, formerly known as RBC Plaza, is the largest and tallest skyscraper in the city of Raleigh, North Carolina, United States. The building at the corner of Fayetteville Street, Martin Street, and Wilmington Streets served as corporate headquarters for RBC Bank (formerly RBC Centura), the U.S. banking arm of Royal Bank of Canada, before being bought by PNC Financial Services. This is also the tallest tower in North Carolina outside of Charlotte, the largest city in the state.

RBC Centura had been courted for years by cities across the East Coast to move its headquarters from Rocky Mount, and in August 2005, CEO Scott Custer announced the bank's intentions to relocate to downtown Raleigh.  RBC wanted a tall building that would add to the Raleigh skyline, but the bank needed only  of office space, enough to fill about five floors of an office building. So, Highwoods partnered with Dominion Partners of Raleigh to build 139 residential condos on top of the office building, enough to stretch the building to 33 floors and make it taller than any other office building in the Triangle.

All of the PNC Plaza condominiums sold out in August 2008, less than three months after Dominion started taking non-refundable deposits on the units, which ranged in price from $230,000 to $800,000. There are separate lobbies for the office tenants and the residential tenants, a rooftop swimming pool for residents, and a second parking garage with 1,050 spaces across the street. In September 2009, the Raleigh office of the Williams Mullen law firm moved into  of office space, located on floors 15, 16 and 17 of the RBC Plaza. The facility also has  of street-level retail and seven floors of parking.

See also
List of tallest buildings in Raleigh
List of tallest buildings in North Carolina

References

External links 

Skyscraper office buildings in Raleigh, North Carolina
Bank company headquarters in the United States
Residential skyscrapers in Raleigh, North Carolina
Office buildings completed in 2008